Mads Greve (born 12 September 1989) is a Danish professional footballer who plays as a centre-back for Danish 1st Division club Vendsyssel FF.

References

Danish men's footballers
Danish Superliga players
1989 births
Living people
Odense Boldklub players
FC Fredericia players
Vendsyssel FF players
Vejle Boldklub players
Danish 1st Division players
Association football defenders